Birks is a surname. Notable people with the surname include:

Anthony Birks (1941–2002), New Zealand Army officer who served as Chief of the General Staff and Chief of Defence Force
Ashley Birks (born 1990), British speedway rider
Charles Napier Birks (1844–1924), founder of South Australian department store Charles Birks & Co
Cliff Birks (1910–1998), English Association football player
Douglas Birks (1919–2004), English cricket player
Frederick Birks (1894–1917), Australian recipient of the Victoria Cross
George Vause Birks (c. 1815–1858), medical doctor, founder of influential family in South Australia
Gerald Birks (1894–1991), Canadian fighter ace in World War I
Graham Birks (born 1942), English Association football player
Henry Birks (1840–1928), Canadian businessman and founder of the Canadian jewelry store, Birks & Mayors
Horace Birks (1897–1985), British Army officer who served during both the World Wars
Jānis Birks (born 1956), Latvian politician, the Mayor of Riga between 2007 and 2009
Jocelynn Birks (born 1993), American volleyball player
 John B. Birks (1920–1979), British physicist and namesake for the Birks' law
Laurie Birks (born 1928), Australian Olympic boxer
Lawrence Birks (1874–1924), Australian electrical engineer in New Zealand
Len Birks (1896–1975), English Association football player
Malcolm Birks (born 1975), English cricket player
Melville Birks (1876–1924), South Australian medical practitioner in Broken Hill, New South Wales
Peter Birks (1941–2004), Regius Professor of Civil Law at the University of Oxford
Ray Birks (1930–2008), Australian rugby league player
Rosetta Jane Birks (1856–1911), Australian  social reformer and philanthropist 
Thomas Rawson Birks (1810–1883), theologian and controversialist at Oxford
Tim Birks, British physicist, 2018 winner of the Rank Prize for Optoelectronics

See also
Birk (name)
Birx (surname)
Burks, surname
Burkes, surname